Ahmed Dar (born 2 July 1982) is a Pakistani first-class cricketer who played for Lahore cricket team.

References

External links
 

1982 births
Living people
Pakistani cricketers
Lahore cricketers
Cricketers from Lahore